Horacio Antonio Montemurro (born 13 January 1962) is an Argentine football manager and former player who played as a defender.

Career
Born in Buenos Aires, Montemurro played for Jorge Newbery and Argentinos Juniors as a youth. He made his senior debut with Lamadrid, before moving to Defensa y Justicia in 1985.

After retiring, Montemurro worked as an assistant manager of Ricardo Caruso Lombardi at several teams in his home country before being named manager of El Porvenir on 19 December 2015. He was subsequently in charge of Sportivo Italiano and former team Lamadrid before moving to Ecuador in 2020, after being named assistant of Miguel Ángel Zahzú at Delfín.

On 3 December 2020, Montemurro was appointed interim manager of Delfín, after Zahzú's dismissal. He returned to his previous role after the appointment of Paúl Vélez, but was definitely appointed manager of the team on 4 August 2021, after Vélez was sacked.

References

External links

1962 births
Living people
Footballers from Buenos Aires
Argentine footballers
General Lamadrid footballers
Defensa y Justicia footballers
Argentine football managers
Sportivo Italiano managers
Delfín S.C. managers
Argentine expatriate football managers
Argentine expatriate sportspeople in Ecuador
Expatriate football managers in Ecuador
Association footballers not categorized by position